Nicola Philippaerts (born 1993) is a Belgian show jumping rider. He is a native of Genk, Limburg, Belgium. He is the son of Ludo Philippaerts and twin brother of Olivier Philippaerts, both show jumping riders as well.

Career 
He competed at the Equestrian at the 2010 Summer Youth Olympics, finishing 23rd individually but winning the gold medal in the team event.

In 2011, he finished fifth in the Longines International Grand Prix of Ireland at the 2011 Dublin Horse Show. He won the gold medal in Comporta, Portugal at the European Young Riders Show Jumping Championship, and the silver medal at the Belgian senior championship.

In 2012, he won the Longines Grand Prix at the 2012 Falsterbo Horse Show.  Together with his father and brother, and Olympic Gold Medal winner Jos Lansink, he finished third at the 2012 Piazza di Siena FEI Nations Cup of Italy.

At the 2016 Olympics, in Rio de Janeiro, he was disqualified from competition for excessive use of his spurs and whip.

References

External links 
 

Belgian show jumping riders
Belgian male equestrians
1993 births
Living people
Sportspeople from Genk
Twin sportspeople
Belgian twins
Equestrians at the 2010 Summer Youth Olympics
Olympic equestrians of Belgium
Equestrians at the 2016 Summer Olympics